Constanza Andrea San Juan Standen (born 18 September 1985) is a Chilean political activist who was elected as a member of the Chilean Constitutional Convention.

In 2018, she was spokeswoman of the Assembly for Huasco Alto against Pascua Lama.

References

External links
 Profile at Lista del Pueblo
 BCN Profile

Living people
1986 births
Chilean activists
People from Santiago
21st-century Chilean politicians
21st-century Chilean women politicians
Members of the List of the People
Members of the Chilean Constitutional Convention